Abigail Jain is an Indian television actress best known for her lead role in the series Humse Hai Liife. She also has a lead role in the Hindi television drama Kya Dill Mein Hai and in Zindagi Wins.

Early life and career

Jain was born in Mumbai. She got the lead role of Kakoon in the serial Kya Dill Mein Hai on 9X. She had been a contestant in dance reality shows like Kaun Jeetege Bollywood Ka Ticket on 9X and Nachle Ve With Saroj Khan on NDTV Imagine. Later she played Sia Dhillion in Humse Hai Liife.

Jain played the lead role of Dr. Aaliya in the weekly medical drama Zindagi Wins on Bindass. She was declared the first runner up in Nach Baliye 8 along with her partner and boyfriend Sanam Johar.

Most recently, she was seen in Saubhagyalakshmi in 2016, Silsila Badalte Rishton Ka in 2018 and joined the cast of Shakti - Astitva Ke Ehsaas Ki in 2019.

Personal life 
Jain got engaged to boyfriend Sanam Johar during their participation in dance reality show Nach Baliye in 2017. Jain also practices yoga.

Filmography

Television

Web series

Awards and nominations

See also
 List of Indian television actresses

References

External links
 

Living people
Indian television actresses
Actresses from Mumbai
21st-century Indian actresses
Year of birth missing (living people)